The Tricores were a Gallic tribe dwelling near the Mediterranean Sea, between the Rhône river and Massalia (modern Marseille), during the during the Iron Age.

Name 

The Tricores are solely attested by Pliny as Tricorium in the 1st century AD. They must be distinguished from the Tricorii of the Drac river valley.

The Gaulish name Tricores probably derives from the prefix tri- ('three') attached to corio- ('army').

Geography 

Pliny describes the territory of the Tricores as located between the Mediterranean Sea to the south and the Tritolli to the north, and between the Rhône river to the west and Massalia to the east. The region of L'Estaque and Vitrolles, to the south and southeast of the Étang de Berre, is a potential candidate.  

According to history Guy Barruol, they were part of the Salluvian confederation.

References

Bibliography 

 
 

Gauls
Tribes of pre-Roman Gaul
Historical Celtic peoples